Experts from many different fields have done a lot of research, debated, and talked about the links between using digital media and mental health. Research suggests that mental health issues arising from social media use affect women more than men and vary according to the particular social media platform used. Psychological or behavioral dependence on social media platforms can result in significant negative functions in individuals' daily lives. Studies show there are several negative effects that social media can have on individuals' mental health and overall well-being. While researchers have attempted to examine why and how social media is problematic, they still struggle to develop evidence-based recommendations on how they would go about offering potential solutions to this issue. Because social media is constantly evolving, researchers also struggle with whether the disorder of problematic social media use would be considered a separate clinical entity or a manifestation of underlying psychiatric disorders. These disorders can be diagnosed when an individual engages in online content/conversations rather than pursuing other interests that occur in real life.

In 2022 a case was successfully litigated that implicated a social media platform in the suicide of a Canadian teenage girl named Amanda Todd who died by hanging . This was the first time that any social media platform was held liable for a user's actions. While the question of what category problematic social media use falls in is still being developed and further researched, the policies and regulations of social media have already started to change. The interest now falls on implementing new laws regarding these penalties and how individuals can aim to keep their well-being safe along with the platforms that they are using, especially when it comes to privacy.

Symptoms 
While there exists no official diagnostic term or measurement, problematic social media use can be conceptualized as a non-substance-related disorder, resulting in preoccupation and compulsion to  engage excessively in social media platforms despite negative consequences.

Problematic social media use is associated with mental health symptoms, such as anxiety and depression in children and young people.

A 2022 meta-analysis showed moderate and significant associations between problematic social media use in youth and increased symptoms of depression, anxiety, and stress. Another meta-analysis in 2019, investigating Facebook use and symptoms of depression, also showed an association, with a small effect size. In a 2018 systematic review and meta-analysis, problematic Facebook use was shown to have negative effects on well-being in adolescents and young adults, and psychological distress was also found with problematic use. Frequent social media use was shown in a cohort study of 15- and 16-year-olds to have an association with self-reported symptoms of attention deficit hyperactivity disorder followed up over two years.

Decrease in mood 
A 2016 technological report by Chassiakos, Radesky, and Christakis identified benefits and concerns in adolescent mental health regarding social media use. It showed that the amount of time spent on social media is not the key factor but rather how time is spent. Declines in well-being and life satisfaction were found in older adolescents who passively consumed social media; however, these were not shown in those who were more actively engaged. The report also found a U-shaped, curvilinear relationship between the amount of time spent on digital media and with risk of depression developing, at both the low and high ends of Internet use.

Eating disorders 
According to research by Flinders University, social media use correlates with eating disorders. The study found eating disorders in 52% of girls and 45% of boys, from a group of 1,000 participants who used social media.

Through the extensive use of social media, adolescents are exposed to images of bodies that are unattainable, especially with the growing presence of photo-editing apps that allow you to alter the way that your body appears in a photo. This can, in turn, influence both the diet and exercise practices of adolescents as they try to fit the standard that their social media consumption has set for them.

Instagram users who partake in looking for social media status and compare themselves to others tend to have an increase in negative various psychological effects including body image issues and eating disorders.  According to a study that included 2,475 students by doctoral student Madeline Wick and her advisor, Pamela Keel, PhD, a psychology professor at Florida State University, 1 in 3 women responded that they edit their pictures to change their weight and shape before posting a picture to Instagram.  A similar study in Australia and New Zealand found 52% of girls ages 13 to 14 with a social media account were very likely to have eating disorders like skipping a meal or overexercising.  These various studies found that teenage girls who viewed their retouched photo and compared that to their untouched photo directly harmed their body image.  Although this happens amongst various age groups and genders it was found that this tends to have a greater effect on the younger age group of women.

Excessive use 
One can evaluate their social media habits and behavior toward it to help determine if an addiction is present. Addictions are a certain type of impulse control disorder, which may lead one to lose track of time while using social media. For instance, one's psychological clock may run slower than usual, and the user's self-consciousness is compromised. Therefore, individuals may passively consume media for longer amounts of time. Psychologists estimate that as many as 5 to 10% of Americans meet the criteria for social media addiction today. Addictive social media use will look much like that of any other substance use disorder, including mood modification, salience, tolerance, withdrawal symptoms, conflict, and relapse.  In the digital age, it is common for adolescents to use their smartphones for entertainment purposes, education, news, and managing their daily life. Therefore, adolescents are further at risk for developing addictive behaviors and habits. Many medical experts have looked at the survey and come up with a clear conclusion, saying that teenagers' excessive smartphone use has an impact on their behavior and even their mental health. If the excessive use of social media and the platforms encompassed therein have proven to cause mental health issues, eating disorders, and lowered self-esteem, and the use of such media has been shown to be addictive in some form or another, medically there should be an avenue to treat the use or excessive use of the media platforms. For example, a study involving 157 online learners showed that, on average, learners on massive open online courses spend half of their online time on YouTube and social media, and less than 2% of visited websites accounted for nearly 80% of their online time. The excessive use is causing underlying health conditions that in themselves are treatable, but if these issues stem from the use of social media platforms, the addictive nature of these platforms should be addressed in a way to reduce or eradicate the health-related or mental related effects resulting. More studies need to be done, more funding has to be provided, and the addiction to such platforms should be seen as a true addiction and treated as such, and not simply discarded as a millennial issue.

Social anxiety  
Social media allows users to openly share their feelings, values, relationships, and thoughts. With the platform social media provides, users, can freely express their emotions. However, social media may also be a platform for discrimination and cyberbullying. There is also a strong positive correlation between social anxiety and social media usage, and in particular between cyberostracism and social media disorder. The defining feature of social anxiety disorder, also called social phobia, is intense anxiety or fear of being judged, negatively evaluated, or rejected in a social or performance situation. Many users with mental illnesses, such as social anxiety, go to the internet as an escape from reality, so they often withdraw from in-person communication and feel most comfortable with online communication. People usually act differently on social media than they do in person, resulting in many activities and social groups being different when using social media. The pros and cons of social media are heavily debated; although using social media can satisfy personal communication needs, those who use them at higher rates are shown to have higher levels of psychological distress.

Lowered self-esteem 
Low self-esteem has generally had some sort of connection to serious mental health illnesses such as depression. some studies have been done to find if social media platforms have any sort of correlation to low self-esteem. One such study in which participants were given the Rosenberg Self-Esteem Scale to rate their self-esteem based on their social media usage found that participants that used Facebook tended to rate themselves more poorly on their general self-esteem.

Mechanisms
A 2017 review article noted the "cultural norm" among adolescents of being always on or connected to social media, remarking that this reflects young people's "need to belong" and stay up-to-date and that this perpetuates a "fear of missing out". Other motivations include information seeking and identity formation, as well as voyeurism and cyber-stalking. For some individuals, social media can become "the single most important activity that they engage in". This can be related to Maslow's hierarchy of needs, with basic human needs often met by social media. Positive-outcome expectations and limited self-control of social media use can develop into "addictive" social media use. Further problematic use may occur when social media is used to cope with psychological stress, or a perceived inability to cope with life demands.

Cultural anthropologist Natasha Dow Schüll noted parallels to the gambling industry inherent to the design of various social media sites, with "'ludic loops' or repeated cycles of uncertainty, anticipation and feedback" potentially contributing to problematic social media use. Another factor directly facilitating the development of addiction to social media is the implicit attitude toward the IT artifact.

Mark D. Griffiths, a chartered psychologist focusing on the field of behavioral addictions, also postulated in 2014 that social networking online may fulfill basic evolutionary drives in the wake of mass urbanization worldwide. The basic psychological needs of "secure, predictable community life that evolved over millions of years" remain unchanged, leading some to find online communities to cope with the new individualized way of life in some modern societies.

According to Andreassen, empirical research indicates that addiction to social media is triggered by dispositional factors (such as personality, desires, and self-esteem), but specific socio-cultural and behavioral reinforcement factors remain to be investigated empirically.

A secondary analysis of a large English cross-sectional survey of 12,866 13 to 16-year-olds published in Lancet found that mental health outcomes problematic use of social media platforms may be in part due to exposure to cyberbullying, as well as displacement in sleep architecture and physical exercise, especially in girls. Through cyberbullying and discrimination researchers have found that depression rates among teens have drastically increased. In a study done on 1,464 random users on Twitter, 64% of those people were depressed, while the majority of depressed users were between 11 and 20. The study was associated with a lack of confidence due to stigma for those who were depressed. Out of the 64% that were depressed, over 90% of them were extremely low in profile images and shared media. Moreover, the study also found a strong correlation between the female gender and expression of depression, concluding that the female-to-male ratio is 2:1 for major depressive disorder.

In 2018, Harvard University neurobiology research technician Trevor Haynes postulated that social media may stimulate the reward pathway in the brain. An ex-Facebook executive, Sean Parker, has also espoused this theory.

Six key mechanisms 
There are six key mechanisms attributed to the addictive nature of social media and messaging platforms.

Endless scrolling and streaming 
To attract maximum user attention, app developers distort time by affecting the 'flow' of content when scrolling. This distortion makes it difficult for users to recognize the length of time they spend on social media. Principles similar to Skinner's variable-ratio conditioning can be found with the intermittent release of rewarding reinforcement in an unpredictable stream of 'bad' content. This makes extinguishing behavioral conditioning difficult. Behavioral conditioning is also achieved via the 'auto-play' default of streaming platforms. The more absorbed the viewer becomes, the more time distortion occurs, making it more difficult to stop watching. This is further coupled with minimal time to cancel the next stream thereby creating a false sense of urgency followed by an absorbing relief.

Endowment effect / Exposure effect 
Investing time in social media platforms generates an emotional attachment to the virtual setting the user creates. The user values this above its actual value, which is referred to as the endowment effect. The more time a person spends curating their social media presence, the more difficult it is for them to give up social media as they have placed an emotional value on this virtual existence higher than its actual value. The user is more prone to loss aversion from this endowment. As a result, they are less willing to stop their use of social media.

This is further compounded by the mere exposure the user has to the respective platforms. This exposure effect suggests that repeated exposure to a distinct stimulus by the user will condition the user into an enhanced or improved attitude toward it. With social media, repetitive exposure to the platforms improves the user’s attitude towards them. The advertising industry has recognized this potential but rarely used it due to their belief in an inherent conflict between overexposure and the law of familiarity. The more mere exposure a user has to a social media platform, the more they like to use it. This makes the act of removing social media problematic thereby highlighting the effect’s contribution to social media’s addictive nature.

Social pressures 
Social media has developed expectations of immediacy which then create social pressures. One study into the social pressures created by the instant messaging platform, WhatsApp, showed the "Last Seen" feature contributed to the expectation of a fast response. This feature serves as an “automatic approximation of availability” thereby denoting a time frame by which the sender is aware the receiver will reply in and similarly a time frame the receiver must reply in without causing tensions to their relationship.

This was further seen in the "Read Receipt" (in the form of ticks) feature on WhatsApp. The nudge of a double tick highlights the reception of the message therefore the sender is consciously aware that the receiver has likely seen the message. The receiver would equally feel pressure to respond fast for fear of violating the sender’s expectation. Since both sides know the working mechanics of the Last Seen and Read Receipt features, social pressure in the speed of response is created.

The effect of this has been linked to the addictive nature of the features as it offers a possible explanation for frequent checking for notifications. Furthermore, it has also been suggested to undermine well-being.

Personalized newsfeed 
Google is the first tech firm to adopt the personalization of user content. The company does this by tracking: “search history, click history, location on Google and on other websites, language search query, choice of web browser and operating system, social connections, and time taken to make search decisions.” Facebook similarly adopted this method in their recording of user endorsement through the "Like" and react options. Facebook’s personalization mechanics are so precise they are capable of tracking the mood of their users. The overall effect of this is that it creates “highly interesting, personalized websites” tailored to each user which in turn leads to more time online and further increases the chances of the user developing an addictive or problematic behavior with social media.

Social rewards and comparisons 
The "Like" mechanism is another example of social media's problematic features. It is a social cue that visually represents the social validation the user either gives or receives. One study explored the quantifiable and qualitative effects the "Like" button had on social endorsement. The study asked 39 adolescents to submit their own Instagram photos alongside neutral and risky photos which were then reproduced into a testing app that controlled the number of likes the photo would initially receive prior to testing. The result found adolescents were more likely to endorse both risky and neutral photos if they had more likes. Furthermore, the study suggested that adolescents were more inclined to perceive a qualitative effect of the photos depending on the strength of peer endorsement. Whilst “quantifiable social endorsement is a relatively new phenomenon,” this study is suggestive of the effects the "Like" option as a social cue has on adolescents.

Another study looking at different types, three modalities (social interaction, simulation, and search for relations), and two genders (male and female) assessed whether self-esteem contributed to Facebook use in the context of a social comparison variable. Males were found to have less of a social comparison orientation between the tested contribution; however, their self-esteem and length of time on Facebook were found to have a negative link. For females, social comparison was the primary factor in the relationship between self-esteem and Facebook use: “[f]emales with low self-esteem seem to spend more time on Facebook in order to compare themselves to others and possibly increase their self-esteem since social comparison serves the function of self-enhancement and self-improvement.”. As a result, females tend to be at a higher risk of developing problematic use of social media than males. In accordance with the individual traits being tested, the study highlights the tendency to socially compare and its relationship with self-esteem and the length of Facebook use.

Zeigarnik Effect / Ovsiankina Effect 
The Zeigarnik Effect suggests the human brain will continue to pursue an unfinished task until a satisfying closure. The endless nature of social media platforms affects this effect as they prevent the user from "finishing" the scrolling thereby developing a subconscious desire to continue and "finish" the task.

The Ovsiankina Effect is similar as it suggests there is a tendency to pick up an unfinished or interrupted action. The “brief, fast-paced give and take” of social media subverts the satisfying closure which in turn creates a need to continue with the intent of producing a satisfying closure.

Platforms consist of unfinished and interruptible mechanisms which affect both of these Effects. Whilst a mechanism of social media platforms, it is more clearly seen with Freemium games like Candy Crush Saga.

Platform-specific risks

Studies have shown differences in motivations and behavioral patterns among social media platforms, especially regarding their problematic use. In the United Kingdom, a study of 1,479 people between 14 and 24 years old compared the psychological benefits and deficits of the five largest social media platforms: Facebook, Instagram, Snapchat, Twitter, and YouTube. Negative effects of smartphone use include “phubbing,” which is snubbing someone by checking one's smartphone in the middle of a real-life conversation. The study was used to check the direct and indirect associations of neuroticism, trait anxiety, and trait fear of missing out with phubbing via state fear of missing out and problematic Instagram use. A total number of 423 adolescents and emerging adults between the ages of 14 to 21 years old (53% female) participated in the study. The findings indicated that females had significantly higher scores of phubbing, fear of missing out, problematic Instagram use, trait anxiety, and neuroticism. Problematic social media use (PSMU) presented in the study that was invested also in the influences of demographics and Big Five personality dimensions on social media use motives; demographics and use motives on social media site preferences; and demographics, personality, popular social media sites, and social media use motives on PSMU. The study consisted of 1008 undergraduate students, between the age of 17 and 32 years old. Participants who preferred Instagram, Snapchat, and Facebook reported higher scores of problematic social media use. The study concluded that YouTube was the only platform with a net positive rating based on 14 questions related to health and well-being, followed by Twitter, Facebook, Snapchat, and finally Instagram. Instagram had the lowest rating: it was identified as having some positive effects such as self-expression, self-identity, and community, but ultimately was outweighed by its negative effects on sleep, body image, and "fear of missing out".

Limiting the use of social media 
A three-week study for limiting social media usage was conducted on 108 female and 35 male undergraduate students at the University of Pennsylvania. Prior to the study, participants were required to have Facebook, Instagram, and Snapchat accounts on an iPhone device. This study observed the student's well-being by sending a questionnaire at the start of the experiment, as well as at the end of every week. Students were asked questions about their well-being on the scale of:  “social support,” “fear of missing out,” “loneliness,” “anxiety,” “depression,” “self-esteem,” and “autonomy and self-acceptance.” The conclusion of the study revealed that limiting social media usage on a mobile phone to 10 minutes per platform per day had a significant impact on well-being. Loneliness and depressive symptoms declined in the group that had limited social media usage. Students with depressive symptoms had a much higher impact with social media restriction if they began with higher levels of depression.

Treatment and research
Currently, no diagnosis exists for problematic social media use in either the ICD-11 or DSM-5.

There are many ways that an addiction to social media can be expressed in individuals. According to clinical psychologist Cecilie Schou Andreassen and her colleagues, there are five potential factors that indicate a person's dependence to social media:

 Mood swings: a person uses social media to regulate his or her mood, or as a means of escaping real world conflicts
 Relevance: social media starts to dominate a person's thoughts at the expense of other activities
 Tolerance: a person increases their time spent on social media to experience previously associated feelings they had while using social media;
 Withdrawal: when a person can not access social media their sleeping or eating habits change or signs of depression or anxiety can become present.
 Conflicts in real life: when social media is used excessively, it can affect real-life relationships with family and friends.

In addition to Andreassen's factors, Griffiths further explains that someone is addicted to social media if their behavior fulfills any of these six criteria:

 Salience: social media becomes the most important part of someone's life;
 Mood modification: a person uses social media as a means of escape because it makes them feel "high", "buzzed", or "numb";
 Tolerance: a person gradually increases their time spent on social media to maintain that escapist feeling;
 Withdrawal: unpleasant feelings or physical sensations when the person is unable to use social media or does not have access to it;
 Conflict: social media use causes conflict in interpersonal dynamics, loses desire to participate in other activities, and becomes pervasive;
 Relapse: the tendency for previously affected individuals to revert to previous patterns of excessive social media use.

He continues to add that excessive use of an activity, like social media, does not directly equate with addiction because there are other factors that could lead to someone's social media addiction including personality traits and pre-existing tendencies.

Turel and Serenko summarize three types of general models people might have that can lead to addictive social media use:

 Cognitive-behavioral model – People increase their use of social media when they are in unfamiliar environments or awkward situations;
 Social skill model – People pull out their phones and use social media when they prefer virtual communication as opposed to face-to-face interactions because they lack self-presentation skills;
 Socio-cognitive model – This person uses social media because they love the feeling of people liking and commenting on their photos and tagging them in pictures. They are attracted to the positive outcomes they receive on social media.

Based on those models, Xu and Tan suggest that the transition from normal to problematic social media use occurs when a person relies on it to relieve stress, loneliness, depression, or provide continuous rewards.

Management 
No established treatments exist, but from research from the related entity of Internet addiction disorder, treatments have been considered, with further research needed. Screen time recommendations for children and families have been developed by the American Academy of Pediatrics.

Possible therapeutic interventions published by Andreassen include:

 Self-help interventions, including application-specific timers;
 Cognitive behavioral therapy; and
 Organizational and schooling support.
Possible treatment for social anxiety disorder includes cognitive behavioral therapy (CBT) as well. CBT helps victims of social anxiety to improve their ways of thinking, behaving, and reacting to stressful situations. Withal, most CBT is held in a group format to help improve social skills.

Medications have not been shown to be effective in randomized, controlled trials for the related conditions of Internet addiction disorder or gaming disorder.

Technology management 
As awareness of these issues has increased, many technology and medical communities have continued to work together to develop novel solutions. Apple Inc. purchased a third-party application and incorporated it as "screen time", promoting it as an integral part of iOS 12. A German technology startup developed an Android phone specifically designed for efficiency and minimizing screen time. News Corp reported multiple strategies for minimizing screen time. Facebook and Instagram have announced "new tools" that they think may assist with addiction to their products. In an interview in January 2019, Nick Clegg, then head of global affairs at Facebook, claimed that Facebook committed to doing "whatever it takes to make this safer online especially for [young people]". Facebook committed to change, admitting "heavy responsibilities" to the global community, and invited regulation by governments. Recent research evidence suggests that providing adaptive assistance can be effective in compensating for self-regulatory skills for some users. For instance, a study involving 157 online learners demonstrated that modifying learners' web browsing environment to support self-regulation was associated with a change in behavior, including a reduction in time spent online, particularly on websites related to entertainment activities. These findings suggest that interventions aimed at modifying the web browsing environments may be effective in reducing excessive time spent on social media and other leisure-oriented websites. However, the effectiveness of the intervention was moderated by learners' individual differences (self-reported personality traits).

Government response 
A survey conducted by Pew Research Center from January 8 through February 7, 2019, found that 80% of Americans go online every day. Among young adults, 48% of 18- to 29-year-olds reported going online 'almost constantly' and 46% of them reported going online 'multiple times per day.' Young adults going online 'almost constantly' increased by 9% just since 2018. On July 30, 2019, U.S. Senator Josh Hawley introduced the Social Media Addiction Reduction Technology (SMART) Act which is intended to crack down on "practices that exploit human psychology or brain physiology to substantially impede freedom of choice". It specifically prohibits features including infinite scrolling and Auto-Play.

A study conducted by Junling Gao and associates in Wuhan, China, on mental health during the COVID-19 outbreak revealed that there was a high prevalence of mental health problems including generalized anxiety and depression. This had a positive correlation to 'frequent social media exposure.' Based on these findings, the Chinese government increased mental health resources during the COVID-19 pandemic, including online courses, online consultation and hotline resources.

Parental responses 
Parents play an instrumental role in protecting their children from problematic social media use. Parents' methods for monitoring, regulating, and understanding their children's social media use are referred to as parental mediation. Parental mediation strategies include active, restrictive, and co-using methods. Active mediation involves direct parent-child conversations that are intended to educate children on social media norms and safety, as well as the variety and purposes of online content. Restrictive mediation entails the implementation of rules, expectations, and limitations regarding children's social media use and interactions. Co-use is when parents jointly use social media alongside their children, and is most effective when parents are actively participating (like asking questions, making inquisitive/supportive comments) versus being passive about it. Active mediation is the most common strategy used by parents, though the key to success for any mediation strategy is consistency/reliability. When parents reinforce rules inconsistently, have no mediation strategy, or use highly restrictive strategies for monitoring their children's social media use, there is an observable increase in children's aggressive behaviors. When parents openly express that they are supportive of their child’s autonomy and provide clear, consistent rules for media use, problematic usage and aggression decreases. Knowing that consistent, autonomy-supportive mediation has more positive outcomes than inconsistent, controlling mediation, parents can consciously foster more direct, involved, and genuine dialogue with their children. This can help prevent or reduce problematic social media use in children and teenagers.

Novel psychiatrist approaches 
Some feel that modern problems require modern solutions, so we are starting to see modern approaches like that of Dr. Alok Kanojia (a psychiatrist known online as Dr. K) who runs not only a coaching program but also YouTube and Twitch channels called HealthyGamerGG, where he talks about mental health, social media addiction, gaming addiction, and conducts interviews.

Scales and measures 
Problematic social media use has been a concern basically since the advent of it. There have been several scales developed and validated that help to understand the issues regarding problematic social media use. One of the first scales was an eight-item scale that was used for Facebook use. The Facebook Intensity Scale (FBI) was used multiple times and showed good reliability and validity. This scale only covered three areas of social media engagement, which left the scale lacking. Although the FBI was a good measure it lacked the needed component of purpose of use. The Multi-dimensional Facebook Intensity Scale (MFIS) investigated different dimensions of use that include overuse and reasons for use. The MFIS is composed of 13 items and has been used on several samples. The MFIS also had good reliability and validity, but the scale was directed toward the use of Facebook, and social media is far more than just one platform. The Social Networking Activity Intensity Scale (SNAIS) was created to look at the frequency of use of several platforms and investigated three facets of engagement with a 14-item survey. This scale looked at the purposes of use both entertainment and social function, and the scale as a whole had acceptable reliability and validity. The Social Media Disorder Scale (SMD) is a nine-item scale that was created to investigate addiction to social media and get to the heart of the issue. This scale has been used in conjunction with multiple scales and does measure social media addiction. The SMD has been tested and has good reliability and validity. This tool can be used by itself or in conjunction with other measures for future research and appears to be a reliable scale. There are many other scales that have been created, however there is not one single scale that is being used by all researchers.

History 
Because technological advances are considered “progress,” it becomes more challenging to admit and confront the negative effects associated with them.

Causality has not been established, despite associations between digital media use and mental health symptoms and diagnoses being observed. Nuances and caveats published by researchers are often misunderstood by the general public and misrepresented by the media. According to a review published in 2016, Internet addiction and social media addiction are not well-defined constructs. No gold standard diagnostic criteria or universally agreed upon theories on the interrelated constructs exist.

The proposed disorder is generally defined if "excessive use damages personal, family and/or professional life" as proposed by Griffiths. The most notable of these addictions being gambling disorder, gaming addiction, Internet addiction, sex addiction, and work addiction.

Several studies have shown that women are more likely to overuse social media, while men are more likely to overuse video games.

There have been studies linking extraversion to overuse of social media, and other addictive tendencies. Along with extraversion, neuroticism has also been linked to an increased risk to developing social media addiction. It has been shown that people who are high in neuroticism are more keen to use a screen to interact with people rather than face to face contact because they find that easier. This has led multiple experts cited by Hawi and colleagues to suggest that digital media overuse may not be a singular construct, with some calling to delineate proposed disorders based on the type of digital media used. A 2016 psychological review stated that "studies have also suggested a link between innate basic psychological needs and social network site addiction [...] Social network site users seek feedback, and they get it from hundreds of people—instantly. Alternatively, it could be argued that the platforms are designed to get users 'hooked'."

Implications 
Research shows that increase social media use and exposure to social media platforms can lead to negative results and bullying over time. While social media's main intention is to share information and communicate with friends and family, there is more evidence pertaining to negative factors rather than positive ones. Not only can social media expose people to bullying, but it can also increase users' chances of depression and self harm. Research assumes that those from the ages of 13-15 struggle the most with these issues, but they can be seen in college students as well. According to the Center for Disease Control and Prevention's 2019 Youth Risk Behavior Surveillance System, data showed that approximately 15% of high school students were electronically bullied in the 12 months prior to the survey that students were asked to complete. Bullying over social media has sparked suicide rates immensely within the last decade.

Molly Russell case 
In November 2017, a fourteen year old British girl from Harrow, London named Molly Russell took her own life after viewing negative, graphic, and descriptive content primarily on social media platforms such as Facebook and Twitter. This news shocked the fourteen year old's parents who mentioned that she had never shown any previous signs of struggle and was doing very well in school. It was revealed in the court that six months prior to Molly's death, she had accumulated a total of 16,300 pieces of negative content on Instagram such as topics of self-harm, depression, and suicide. While breaking the numbers down on how often Molly viewed these kinds of posts each day, it was revealed that twelve per day were related to either self-harm or depression. Due to the fact that both Instagram and Pinterest have algorithms set in place where similar content will show up often if it is interacted with more than once, Molly was surrounded by this content daily. It was also noted that throughout Molly's experience on social media, there were never any warning signs pertaining to the information she viewed on these particular platforms. Not only was this the first time that an internet company has been legally blamed for the death of a teenager, but this is also the first time that senior executives were required to give evidence in an official court of law. Technology companies such as Pinterest and Meta (which owns Instagram) were considered to be at fault for the lack of policies and regulations that were not already set into place prior to Molly's death. Between 2009 and 2019, there has been a 146% increase in suicide rates and can be alarming since social media plays such an active role in teenager's behavior. Merry Varney, the lawyer who represented Molly's case explained that the findings used in court "captured all of the elements of why this material is so harmful." Dr. Navin Venugopal was the child psychiatrist asked to speak on this case when they were determining Molly's cause of death. Dr. Venugopal disclosed that after reviewing Molly's content on both Pinterest and Instagram, Molly was highly at risk. Even more so, he called the material "disturbing and distressing" and was unable to sleep well for weeks. The coroner of this case, Andrew Walker also concluded that Molly's death was "an act of self harm suffering from depression and the negative effects of online content". Molly's case has sparked a lot of attention not only across the UK but in the U.S. as well. It raises the question on whether or not policies and regulations will either be set into place or changed to protect the safety of children on the Internet. Child safety campaigners hope that creating regulations will help to shift the fundamentals that are associated with social media platforms such as Instagram and Pinterest.

Laws, policies, and regulations to minimize harm 
Molly Russell's case sparked discussion both in the UK and the U.S. on how to protect individuals from harmful online content. In the UK, the Online Safety Bill was officially introduced into Parliament in March 2022: the bill covers a range of possible dangerous content such as revenge porn, grooming, hate speech, or anything related to suicide. Overall, the bill will not only protect children from online content but talk about how they can deal with this content that may be illegal. It also covers verification roles and advertising as this will all be covered on the social media platform's terms and conditions page. If the social media platforms fail to comply with these new regulations, they will face a $7500 fine for each offense. When it comes to the U.S., recommendations were offered such as finding an independent agency to implement a system of regulations similar to the Online Safety Bill in the U.K. Another potential idea was finding a specific rule making agency where the authority is strictly and solely focused on a digital regulator who is available 24/7. California already launched an act called the Age Appropriate Design Code Act in August 2022, which aims to protect children under the age of eighteen especially regarding privacy on the Internet. The overall hope and goal of these new laws, policies, and regulations set into place is to 1) ensure that a case such as Molly's never happens again and 2) protects individuals from harmful online content that can lead to mental health problems such as suicide, depression, and self-harm.

See also
 Algorithmic radicalization
 Digital media use and mental health
 Dopamine fasting
 Facebook–Cambridge Analytica data scandal
 Facebook Files
 
 Problematic smartphone use
 Social influence bias
 Social media bias
 The Social Dilemma

References

Further reading
National Institute of Mental Health, (2099), Social Anxiety Disorder : More Than Just Shyness, U.S, retrieved from https://www.nimh.nih.gov/health/publications/social-anxiety-disorder-more-than-just-shyness/index.shtml

Walton, A. G. (2018, November 18).
 

Digital media use and mental health
Social media
Social influence
Behavioral addiction